Emir Obuća (born 11 December 1978) is a Bosnian football manager and former player who is currently working as an assistant manager at Bosnian Premier League club Sarajevo.

Playing career
Obuća had several spells with hometown club Sarajevo, winning one league title and four domestic cups with them. He scored 89 goals in 205 games for the club.

Managerial career
On 20 October 2022, Obuća was named as Sarajevo's caretaker manager, following Feđa Dudić's resignation. In his first game as manager, Sarajevo beat Posušje in a league game on 23 October. On 5 November 2022, Obuća suffered his first defeat as manager in a 2–0 loss to Sloboda Tuzla.

Managerial statistics

Honours

Player
Sarajevo 
Bosnian Premier League: 2006–07
Bosnian Cup: 1996–97, 1997–98, 2001–02, 2004–05

Litex Lovech 
Bulgarian Cup: 2003–04

Individual 
Bosnian Premier League Top Goalscorer: 2002–03 (24 goals)

References

External links

1978 births
Living people
Footballers from Sarajevo
Association football forwards
Bosnia and Herzegovina footballers
FK Sarajevo players
K.V.K. Tienen-Hageland players
K.R.C. Mechelen players
FK Olimpik players
PFC Litex Lovech players
Pas players
Rah Ahan players
NK SAŠK Napredak players
NK Čelik Zenica players
Premier League of Bosnia and Herzegovina players
Challenger Pro League players
First Professional Football League (Bulgaria) players
Persian Gulf Pro League players
First League of the Federation of Bosnia and Herzegovina players
Bosnia and Herzegovina expatriate footballers
Expatriate footballers in Belgium
Bosnia and Herzegovina expatriate sportspeople in Belgium
Expatriate footballers in Bulgaria
Bosnia and Herzegovina expatriate sportspeople in Bulgaria
Expatriate footballers in Iran
Bosnia and Herzegovina expatriate sportspeople in Iran
Bosnia and Herzegovina football managers
Premier League of Bosnia and Herzegovina managers
FK Sarajevo managers